Bobo Ridge is an isolated rock ridge  long, extending west along the north side of Albanus Glacier and marking the southwest extremity of the Tapley Mountains. First roughly mapped by the Byrd Antarctic Expedition, 1933–35, it was named by the Advisory Committee on Antarctic Names for Robert Bobo, a meteorologist with the McMurdo Station winter party of 1963.

References 

Ridges of the Ross Dependency
Gould Coast